Maurice O'Neill was an Irish Republican Army (IRA) Captain, captured in 1942 after a shoot out with Irish police, and promptly tried and executed, one of only two people executed in independent Ireland for a non-murder offence.

Background
O'Neill was from an Irish republican family in the farming community of Caherciveen, County Kerry. He and his older brother Sean were dedicated Irish republicans. Maurice O'Neill fought in the Irish Republican Army's 1942-44 Northern Campaign and was assigned to the IRA's General Headquarters (GHQ) at the time of his capture. In the early 1930s, O'Neills brother Sean served in the IRAs Dublin Brigade and served on GHQ Staff IRA in various capacities from 1945 to 1955.

Arrest
On 24 October 1942, Maurice O'Neill was arrested after a raid by the Irish Police (Garda Síochána) in which Garda Detective Officer Mordant was shot and killed in Donnycarney, Dublin. The mission of the police raid was the capture of Harry White – the IRA Quartermaster General. White escaped capture and O'Neill was arrested but not charged with the murder of the Detective Officer but with "shooting with intent". It is thought that the Detective Officer Mordants death may have been a result of cross fire between Special Branch policemen.

Trial and execution 
In 1939 the Irish legislature, the Oireachtas, passed the Offences against the State Acts 1939–1998, which established Special Criminal Courts. O'Neill was promptly tried in a Military Court and found guilty of a capital offence.  Sentenced to death, and with no appeal provided for in the relevant law, he was executed on 12 November 1942, just 19 days after his arrest, by the Irish Army in Mountjoy Prison. O'Neill's body was buried in the grounds of the prison. O'Neill was one of seven IRA men executed in Ireland between September 1940 and December 1944: Patrick McGrath, Thomas Harte, Richard Goss, George Plant, and Maurice O'Neill were executed by firing squad, while two others were hanged – Tom Williams in Crumlin Road Gaol, Belfast and Charlie Kerins in Mountjoy Prison, Dublin. Maurice O'Neill and Richard Goss were the only people executed by the Irish state for a non-murder crime.

O'Neill's execution provoked particularly widespread protests, as he was a popular figure in his native Kerry. The 25 year old O'Neill apparently was stoic and calm when his fate became clear. In a letter to his elder brother Sean from Arbour Hill Prison, he wrote: "I suppose you saw in the papers where I met my Waterloo last Saturday night. Well, such are the fortunes of war...there is only one sentence, death or release. So I believe it is the full penalty for me. There is no good in having false hopes, hard facts must be faced."

Many Irish republican prisoners were released in 1948 as was the body of Maurice O'Neill (on 17 Sep 1948). Volunteer O'Neill is buried in the Republican plot at Cahersiveen graveyard, Cahersiveen, County Kerry, Ireland. 
O'Neill's name is listed on a monument in Fairview Park, Dublin with the names other IRA members of that period who lost their lives. The Maurice O'Neill Bridge to Valentia Island was built in 1970 and named in memory of the young farmer captured and judged by the military court before being executed in 1942.

References 
Footnotes

Sources
 English, Richard (2003), Armed Struggle: the History of the IRA, Oxford University Press, Oxford, ISBN 0-19-516605-1
 Wood, Ian S (2010), Britain, Ireland and the Second World War, Edinburgh University Press, ISBN 978-0-7486-3001-1

Executed Irish people
Irish republicans
Irish Republican Army (1922–1969) members
1942 deaths
People executed by Ireland by firing squad